The 1988 Prix de l'Arc de Triomphe was a horse race held at Longchamp on Sunday 2 October 1988. It was the 67th running of the Prix de l'Arc de Triomphe.

The winner was Tony Bin, a five-year-old horse trained in Italy by Luigi Camici. The winning jockey was John Reid.

Race details
 Sponsor: CIGA Hotels
 Purse: 8,500,000 F; First prize: 5,000,000 F
 Going: Firm
 Distance: 2,400 metres
 Number of runners: 24
 Winner's time: 2m 37.3s

Full result

 Abbreviations: shd = short-head; hd = head; nk = neck

Winner's details
Further details of the winner, Tony Bin.
 Sex: Horse
 Foaled: 7 April 1983
 Country: Ireland
 Sire: Kampala; Dam: Severn Bridge (Hornbeam)
 Owner: Veronica del Bono Gaucci
 Breeder: Pat O'Callaghan

References

External links
 Colour Chart – Arc 1988

Prix de l'Arc de Triomphe
 1988
1988 in Paris
Prix de l'Arc de Triomphe